Oganes Arutunyan (born 15 October 1960) is a former Soviet Armenian Greco-Roman wrestler and current coach. He won a gold medal at the 1985 European Wrestling Championships and silver medal at the 1985 World Wrestling Championships at 57 kg.

Biography
Arutunyan was born on 15 October 1960 in Talin, Armenia. His family moved to Gyumri in 1966, where he began studying Greco-Roman wrestling in 1972 under the coaching of Yuri Karapetyan. In 1977, he became the USSR Champion as a junior.

In 1978, Arutunyan entered the Belarusian State University of Physical Training and moved to Minsk, where he continued to train under honored coach of the USSR Alexander Sheleg. He won the USSR Championship in 1984 and 1985. Arutunyan won the gold medal at the 1985 European Wrestling Championships in Leipzig and the silver medal at the 1985 World Wrestling Championships in Kolbotn. In 1989, he completed his career.

Later he participated in the veterans tournament and as a coach worked on a master's degree at the College of Sports and Olympic Games preparations. Since 2007, he works as a coach on physical training for FC Dinamo Minsk.

References

External links
 

1960 births
Living people
People from Aragatsotn Province
Armenian wrestlers
Soviet male sport wrestlers
World Wrestling Championships medalists
European Wrestling Champions